High Seas Fisheries Management is management of fisheries outside of global exclusive economic zones or Areas Beyond National Jurisdiction.

Related Publications
U.R. Sumaila, V.W.Y. Lam, D.D. Miller, L. Teh, R.A. Watson, D. Zeller, et al.,Winners and losers in a world where the high seas is closed to fishing, Scientific Reports. 5 (2015) 8481.
C. White, C. Costello, Close the High Seas to Fishing?, PLoS Biology 12 (2014). 
R. Blasiak, N. Yagi, Shaping an international agreement on marine biodiversity beyond areas of national jurisdiction: Lessons from high seas fisheries, Marine Policy. 71 (2016) 210–216. 
U.R.  Sumaila, D. Zeller, R. Watson, J. Alder, D. Pauly, Potential costs and benefits of marine reserves in the high seas, Marine Ecology Progress Series 345 (2007) 305–310. 
W.W.L. Cheung, M.C. Jones, V.W.Y. Lam, D.D. Miller, Y. Ota, L. Teh, et al., Transform high seas management to build climate resilience in marine seafood supply, Fish and Fisheries. (2016).

Fisheries science
Fisheries law
Sustainable fishery
Natural resource management